Group D of EuroBasket 2017 consisted of , , , ,  and . The games were played between 1 and 7 September 2017. All games were played at the Ülker Sports Arena in Istanbul, Turkey.

Standings

All times are local (UTC+3).

Matches

Belgium v Great Britain

Serbia v Latvia

Turkey v Russia

Latvia v Belgium

Russia v Serbia

Great Britain v Turkey

Latvia v Great Britain

Belgium v Russia

Serbia v Turkey

Russia v Latvia

Great Britain v Serbia

Turkey v Belgium

Russia v Great Britain

Belgium v Serbia

Latvia v Turkey

References

Group D
International basketball competitions hosted by Turkey
2017–18 in British basketball
2017–18 in Turkish basketball
2017–18 in Latvian basketball
2017–18 in Serbian basketball
2017–18 in Russian basketball
2017–18 in Belgian basketball
Sports competitions in Istanbul